Hartmut Wekerle (born May 30, 1944) is a German medical scientist and neurobiologist. He is an emeritus director at the Max Planck Institute of Neurobiology and was the head of the department of Neuroimmunology until 2012.

Biography 
Hartmut Wekerle was born in Waldshut in 1944. He studied medicine at the University of Freiburg. In 1967, he began scientific research at the Max Planck Institute for Immunobiology in Freiburg as a PhD student under Herbert Fischer. He finished his doctorate in 1971. After graduation, he worked at the Weizmann Institute of Science from 1971 to 1973 as a postdoctorate researcher. Later on, he led the Research Group for Multiple Sclerosis at the Institute of Clinical Neurobiology at the University Hospital of the University of Würzburg. In 1988, he was appointed director at the Max Planck Institute of Neurobiology (now Max Planck Institute for Biological Intelligence). After receiving the Emeritus status at the institute in 2012, he continued his research for another five years as a Senior Professorship funded by the Hertie Foundation.

Scientific focus
Hartmut Wekerle's work has been devoted to the study of cellular immune responses and mechanisms in the course of multiple sclerosis and other inflammatory diseases in the nervous system. 

In particular, his research contributed to the following discoveries: 
 Detection of autoreactive T cell clones in the healthy immune system and their activation in autoimmune encephalomyelitis
 Immunocompetence of central nervous glial cells 
 Regulatory CD8 T cells in experimental autoimmune encephalomyelitis
 Regulation of CNS immune reactivity by active neurons
 Migration pathways of autoimmune T cells to the central nervous system
 Activation of CNS autoimmune T cells by intestinal microbiota
 Activation of CNS autoimmune T cells by MS derived microbiota

Awards (Selection)
 Ernst Jung Prize for Medicine (1982)
 K-J. Zülch Prize (1999, awarded by the Max Planck Society, now known as The International Prize for Translational Neuroscience of the Gertrud Reemtsma Foundation)
 Charcot Award (International Federation of MS Societies, 2001)
 Louis D Award (Grand Prix des Academies des Sciences, Paris, 2002)
 Betty and David Koetser Award (Zurich, 2005)
 Jacob Henle Medal (University of Goettingen, 2017)

Honorary Degrees and Memberships
 Honorary Professor, University of Munich (1993)
 Member of the German National Academy of Sciences Leopoldina (2002)
 Honorary Doctorate of the Medical Faculty of the University of Hamburg (2013)
 Honorary Doctorate of the University of Würzburg (2014)
 Honorary Member of the Société Française de Neurologie (2016)
 Honorary Member of the Cuban Neursocience Society (2017)
 Hertie School Senior Professorship (2011)

References

1944 births
Living people
20th-century German biologists
Multiple sclerosis
German neuroscientists
People from Waldshut-Tiengen
University of Freiburg alumni
Max Planck Institute directors